The 2005 USA Outdoor Track and Field Championships was organised by USA Track & Field and held from June 23 to 26 at The Home Depot Center in Carson, California. The four-day competition served as the national championships in track and field for the United States and also the trials for the 2005 World Championships in Athletics.

It was the first that the stadium in Carson had held the combined gender national track and field event, but the fourth straight time that the event was hosted in California, having previously been to Sacramento and Palo Alto. The Home Depot Center launched the Adidas Track Classic earlier that year, which was briefly a prominent annual track meeting for American athletes. The USA Junior Championships were held in conjunction with the event and the events served as selection for the 2005 Pan American Junior Athletics Championships.

Athletes that finished in the top three of their event and held the IAAF qualifying standard were eligible to represent the United States at the 2005 World Championships. The United States was able to send three athletes per event to the competition, excluding any American reigning world champions, who received automatic qualification separate from the national selection. The World Championships national selection for the marathon and 50 kilometres walk were incorporated into the discrete national championship meets for those events. Selection for the relay races were made by committee.

On the first day, 2004 Olympic champion Timothy Mack became a high profile omission from the national team and he finished outside of the top three of the men's pole vault. The men's 100 m provided drama with the initial disqualification of reigning Olympic champion Justin Gatlin for a false start being overturned. Gatlin won the title while fellow Olympic winner Maurice Greene pulled up injured mid-race. Gatlin also won the 200 m, being the first to do that double since Kirk Baptiste in 1985. Stacy Dragila won a seventh straight women's pole vault title (her ninth in total). Tim Broe had a third straight men's 5000 m win in a championship record time. Hammer thrower James Parker also won his third consecutive national title while javelin specialist Breaux Greer extended his unbeaten run to six.

A total of twelve athletes selected from the national championships went on to win individual gold medals at the World Championships that year. A total of 120 athletes were selected for the national team as a result of the national championships.

One athlete was disqualified for a doping infraction: Rickey Harris, a men's 400 m hurdles finalist, was later shown to have failed a drug test a month earlier at the same venue. Sprinters Marion Jones, Chryste Gaines and Tim Montgomery both attended but withdrew from the championships, citing injury. Montgomery and Gaines were banned from the sport later that year for doping as part of the BALCO scandal, which also implicated Jones.

The meet was marred before it began as official Paul Suzuki was killed, being struck in the head by a shot put during practice for the shot put competition.  The resulting analysis of official's procedures and risk management greatly affected the conduct of throwing events since.

Results
Key:

Men track events

Men field events

Women track events

Women field events

World Championships qualification

Automatic byes
A total of five American athletes were eligible for automatic byes into the 2005 World Championships in Athletics as a result of their being the defending champions from the 2003 World Championships in Athletics. Torri Edwards, the reigning women's 100 meters  world champion was ineligible due to doping ban.

John Capel: men's 200 meters
Tyree Washington: men's 400 meters (did not take up bye)
Allen Johnson: men's 110 m hurdles
Dwight Phillips: men's long jump
Tom Pappas: men's decathlon (did not take up bye)

Non-top three selections

One month after the national championships, the men's 200 m third placer Shawn Crawford opted to withdraw from that World Championship event due a foot injury and to focus on the 100 m instead, allowing the national fourth place athlete Wallace Spearmon to take the third individual 200 m spot. Men's 20 km walk third place athlete Benjamin Shorey did not have the qualifying standard and Kevin Eastler (fourth in Carson) took his place as he has the standard. The third men's high jump spot went to fourth place Kyle Lancaster as Keith Moffatt did not have the "A" standard.

Joel Brown, fourth in the men's 110 m hurdles, was selected as the trials winner Allen Johnson had a bye as defending champion. Walter Davis gained similarly from the bye of men's long jump champion Dwight Phillips.

Erin Aldrich won the third women's high jump spot as third place Sharon Day failed to meet the "A" standard. Rose Richmond, fourth behind Brianna Glenn, took the women's long jump spot in the same circumstance.

References

Results
Full Results - Open . USATF. Retrieved on 2015-06-27.
Day reports
Dunaway, James (2005-06-24). Pate is back - Mack is out - USATF Championships DAY ONE. IAAF. Retrieved on 2015-07-01.
Dunaway, James (2005-06-25). Johnson out-leans rivals in 12.99 stunner - USATF Championships, DAY TWO. IAAF. Retrieved on 2015-07-01.
Dunaway, James (2005-06-26). Gatlin wins 100m but Hart's athletes steal the day - 2005 USATF, Day Three . IAAF. Retrieved on 2015-07-01.
Dunaway, James (2005-06-27). Clement sweeps home with 47.24 sec hurdles - USATF Champs, Final Day. IAAF. Retrieved on 2015-07-01.

USA Outdoor Track and Field Championships
USA Outdoors
Track, Outdoor
Sports competitions in Carson, California
Track and field in California
USA Outdoor Track and Field Championships